Austenland is a 2013 romantic comedy film directed by Jerusha Hess. Based on Shannon Hale's 2007 novel of the same name and produced by author Stephenie Meyer, it stars Keri Russell as a single thirty-something obsessed with Jane Austen's 1813 novel Pride and Prejudice, who travels to a British resort called Austenland, in which the Austen era is recreated. JJ Feild, Jane Seymour, Bret McKenzie, and Jennifer Coolidge co-star.

Plot

Jane Hayes, an American woman obsessed with Jane Austen – especially Colin Firth's portrayal of Mr. Darcy in the 1995 BBC adaptation of Pride and Prejudice – spends her entire savings on a trip to a Jane Austen-themed resort in England. At “Austenland”, guests receive pseudonyms and period costumes, living as ladies of the Regency era. The highlight of the resort is guaranteed romance with the male actors, though no touching is allowed.

While Jane can only afford the cheapest "copper" package, the other guests have purchased the most expensive "platinum" option. Although she befriends fellow guest Ms. “Elizabeth Charming”, Jane is treated with disdain by the manager, Mrs. Wattlesbrook, who prefers the wealthier guests. 

Jane and Elizabeth meet their actor-companions – the obsequious Colonel Andrews and the unenthusiastic Mr. Henry Nobley, Mrs. Wattlesbrook's nephew – and “Lady Amelia Heartwright”, another guest. Amelia and Elizabeth flirt openly with Nobley, who is reserved and Jane finds disagreeable. (Their argument mirrors the first meeting of Elizabeth Bennet and Mr. Darcy in Pride and Prejudice).

Martin, the resort's chauffeur/stablehand, flirts with Jane. Jealous, Nobley rescues her from walking in the rain. She visits Martin at his quarters; after more flirting and witnessing the birth of a foal, they kiss, and spend the following afternoon together. When another actor, the muscular Captain George East, arrives and flirts with Jane, Martin rebuffs her for "parading around" with the actors. She asks if he is breaking up with her, and he replies that they were never "going steady".

Forced to play piano for the group, Jane performs the only song she knows, "Hot in Herre", shocking Mrs. Wattlesbrook. On her way to find Martin, Jane is stopped by Nobley, who warns against “cavorting with the servants". Returning to the house, Jane fights off a drunken Mr. Wattlesbrook.

Determined to find love by the end of her stay, Jane takes charge of her "story". Elizabeth helps her steal some of Amelia's costumes, and Jane charms the group with her new-found confidence. Mrs. Wattlesbrook discovers Jane's contraband cell phone and prepares to evict her, but Amelia lies to save her. In exchange, Amelia blackmails Jane into helping her and East be alone together. 

The party rehearses a play (mirroring what the characters did in Mansfield Park), and Jane pairs herself with Nobley to allow Amelia time with East. Jane and Nobley bond, and Martin attempts to apologize to her. After the disastrous play, Jane and Nobley sneak off to her room, where he requests a dance during the final ball.

At the ball, Nobley confesses his love to Jane. Disillusioned after watching the other actors fulfill their guests' fantasies with fake proclamations of love, she declares that she would rather have something real and leaves, spending the evening with Martin.

Departing Austenland, Jane discovers that Amelia is American, and that Nobley had asked Amelia to pretend Jane's phone was hers to prevent Jane being sent away. Mrs. Wattlesbrook reveals that the actor assigned to Jane was not Nobley, but Martin – whose romance with Jane was fully scripted. Angry at being duped and certain she is not the only guest assaulted by Mr. Wattlesbrook, Jane threatens to sue Mrs. Wattlesbrook and shut down Austenland.

Martin is sent to the airport to smooth things over with Jane, but Nobley appears, asserting that his own affections were genuine, but Jane dismisses them both. When Nobley tries again to express his feelings, Jane thanks him for being "perfect" and leaves.

Back home, Jane clears out her Darcy collection. Nobley arrives, having traveled across the Atlantic to return her sketchpad. He explains that his name truly is Henry Nobley, he is a history professor who simply wanted to experience the Austen era, and that he does love her. Jane finally believes him and they kiss.

A mid-credits scene reveals that Elizabeth has bought Austenland and turned it into a theme park, assisted by Colonel Andrews. Mr. Wattlesbrook now works as a garbage picker, Captain East does a strip show to Amelia's delight, Martin is snubbed by the guests, and Jane and Nobley are still very much in love.

Cast
Keri Russell as Jane Hayes
JJ Feild as Mr. Henry Nobley
Bret McKenzie as Martin
Jennifer Coolidge as Elizabeth Charming
James Callis as Colonel Andrews
Jane Seymour as Mrs. Wattlesbrook
Georgia King as Lady Amelia Heartwright
Ricky Whittle as Captain George East
Rupert Vansittart as Mr. Wattlesbrook
Richard Reid as Nigel

Production
Austenland was filmed in the summer of 2012 at West Wycombe Park in Buckinghamshire. Rupert Vansittart played Mr. Hurst in the 1995 mini-series.

Release
The film premiered at the 2013 Sundance Film Festival on January 18, 2013, and its distribution rights were bought by Sony Pictures Worldwide Acquisitions soon thereafter for $4 million.

It was theatrically released in four theaters in the United States on August 16, 2013. On the weekend of August 30, it went into wider release, showing in 52 theaters.

Reception
The review aggregator Rotten Tomatoes reported that 32% of critics have given the film a positive review based on 114 reviews, with an average rating of 4.80/10. The site's critics consensus reads, "Despite an intriguing premise and fine performances from a talented cast, Austenland succumbs to outworn romcom cliches and slapstick gags." On Metacritic, the film has a weighted average score of 42 out of 100 based on 32 critics, indicating "mixed or average reviews".

References

External links

2013 romantic comedy films
2013 films
British independent films
British romantic comedy films
American independent films
American romantic comedy films
Films based on American novels
Films based on romance novels
Films scored by Ilan Eshkeri
Films set in Buckinghamshire
Films shot in Buckinghamshire
Sony Pictures Classics films
Stage 6 Films films
Works based on Pride and Prejudice
Works about Jane Austen
2013 directorial debut films
2013 independent films
Films about fandom
2010s English-language films
2010s American films
2010s British films